The  was the 68th edition of annual NHK's Kōhaku Uta Gassen, held on December 31, 2017, live from NHK Hall (Tokyo, Japan). It was broadcast in Japan through NHK General Television (TV) and NHK Radio 1 (Radio), and worldwide through NHK World Premium and TV Japan (in US). This year, the conductor of the festival's closing theme "Hotaru no Hikari" will be replaced by Shunichi Tokura, due to the death of Masaaki Hirao on July 21, 2017.

Broadcast runs from 19:15 (JST) to 23:45 (JST), with a 5-minute break for the latest news. This is the 29th Heisei Era edition.

White team won this event with 2,237,644 votes, thus making the 37th overall victory from Shirogumi.

Broadcast and possible final edition from Heisei 
Broadcast time was announced on September 7. This year's theme, "Let's Sing a Dream" (夢を歌おう) remains unchanged until the 70th edition (2019), in support of the upcoming 2020 Summer Olympics and 2020 Summer Paralympics. The 68th Kouhaku airs on December 31 (Sunday), starting from 19:15 JST and ending at 23:45 JST, with a 5-minute break for the latest news. In Japan, the broadcast takes place through NHK-G and Radio 1, and worldwide by NHK World Premium and TV Japan. In United States, the show is broadcast through TV Japan, starting around 15:10 (Eastern Time). Viewers outside Japan (except US) can watch Kouhaku on NHK World Premium, starting at 10:15 UTC, the same time as the NHK-G broadcast.

This is the 29th and penultimate edition of the program in the Heisei Period, because of the possible abdication of Emperor Akihito, already scheduled for March 31, 2019. The Kouhaku has already undergone a transition of periods. The 39th edition (last of the Showa Period) was held a week before Hirohito's death, and the 40th edition was the first ever in Heisei. The show will go through a new era transition in 2019, with the 70th edition being the first under a new Japanese imperial era.

On November 13, NHK announced their team leaders. Once again, Kasumi Arimura will be the captain from red team, while Kazunari Ninomiya from Arashi will serve as captain from white team for the 6th time (counted with other 5 times while Arashi served as captains). Japanese comedian Teruyoshi Uchimura will be the mediator, thus making the second edition in a row to not repeat mediator from previous edition.

On November 16, the list of program artists was revealed and a press conference announcing the participants took place. The second mediator NHK news anchor Maho Kuwako was also announced. Namie Amuro, who is set to retire September next year, was not confirmed to appear. NHK production manager Ryo Yajima made a statement saying that negotiations for her appearance are still ongoing. On December 19, Amuro was confirmed to appear on Kōhaku as a special guest.

On December 7, it was announced that Shunichi Tokura is the new conductor of the closing theme, "Hotaru no Hikari", replacing Masaaki Hirao, who died in July. The guest judges were revealed on December 20. On December 22, Keisuke Kuwata was announced to appear as a special guest. The song list was revealed on December 23.

On December 29, rehearsals from the main event has been started. Namie Amuro and Keisuke Kuwata (Special Acts) will perform before the final acts (Sayuri Ishikawa and Yuzu) prior the announcement of the winning team.

Personnel

Main hosts and team leaders 
Mediators
 Teruyoshi Uchimura
 Maho Kuwako

Team Leaders
 : Kasumi Arimura
 : Kazunari Ninomiya (Arashi)

Live Comments 
Announcer NHK Radio 1: Tomoko Kogou, Naoki Ninomiya
PR, Commentary ("Ura Talk Channel"): Bananaman, Ai Tsukahara
Live Stream ("Back Stage Talk"): Naomi Watanabe

Judges 
 Hifumi Katō (former shogi player)
 Ryohei Suzuki (actor), will star in Segodon
 Issei Takahashi (actor), played Ono Masatsugu in Naotora: The Lady Warlord
 Mariko Hayashi, the original author of Segodon
 Nobuko Miyamoto (actress), appeared in Hiyokko
 Mai Murakami (artistic gymnasts)
 Ryōta Murata (boxer)
 Riho Yoshioka (actress)

Live Music Performance 
 Oomisoka Ongakutai 2017

Special Guests 
 Shunichi Tokura 
 Namie Amuro
 Keisuke Kuwata
 Tetsuko Kuroyanagi
 Yoshihide Kiryū

Other Guests 
 Toro-Salmon
 Kazuko Kurosawa
 Kumamon
 Wakana Aoi
 Sunshine Ikezaki
 Miyazon
 Austin Mahone

Contestants 
Debuting or returning artists are in bold.

Artists not attending this year
RED TEAM Ayaka, Ikimonogakari, Hikaru Utada, Shinobu Otake, Kaori Kozai, PUFFY, Miwa
WHITE TEAM Kenta Kiritani, Kinki Kids, The Yellow Monkey, AAA, V6, Radwimps, Radio Fish

Debuting artists
Ten artists are attending for the first time
 Daichi Miura celebrated his 20th anniversary since debuting as a member of Folder in 1997. Since making his solo debut in 2005, he has become known for his powerful singing and outstanding dancing skills. His single, "Excite", placed number one on the Oricon weekly single chart.
 Hey! Say! JUMP celebrated their 10th anniversary. Members Yamada and Chinen have participated four times as NYC (60th–63rd).
 Elephant Kashimashi celebrated their 30th anniversary. They embarked on a forty-seven prefecture anniversary tour in April.
 Tortoise Matsumoto has appeared with his band Ulfuls two times (47th and 52nd). His duet song with Ringo Sheena, "The Main Street", was used as the CM song for the luxury shopping complex Ginza Six.
 SHISHAMO's song, "Ashita mo", was used as the theme song for a mobile phone commercial (NTT DoCoMo).
 Takehara Pistol's song, "Yo, Soko no Wakai no", was used as the theme song for a Sumitomo Life Insurance commercial. The song was a "long hit".
 Wanima's song, "Yattemiyo", was used as the theme song for a mobile phone commercial (au). The commercial and song became hot topics and the song was a hit.
 Little Glee Monster performed at the Nippon Budokan January this year. Tickets to their concert sold out in just one minute. The group, who are all in their teens, made their major label debut in 2014. They are popular among people of all ages and are known for their solid singing skills.
 Twice debuted in Japan this year. "TT pose", which is part of the choreography for TT, became a trend for young women in Japan. Their debut single, "One More Time", placed number one on the Oricon weekly single chart.
 Enka singer Midori Oka released her first album this year. She also performed her first solo concert.

Returning artists
Four artists are returning.
 Matsu Takako sang the theme song for NHK's 97th asadora, Warotenka. She has performed at Kohaku two times. Her last appearance was in 1999 for the 50th edition.
 Mai Kuraki sang the theme song for the film Detective Conan: Crimson Love Letter. Her song, "Togetsukyo (Kimi Omou)", charted for 31 weeks on the Oricon weekly single chart. It was later named "the best-selling physical single by female solo singer in 2017". Kuraki has sung twenty-one theme songs for the Detective Conan animation series. In July, she was awarded Guinness World Record for "most theme songs sung by the same artist for an animation series". Kuraki has performed at Kohaku three times. Her last appearance was in 2005 for the 56th edition.

Performance Order

Songs performed on Medleys
 Little Glee Monster: "Jupiter", "Suki da"
 Daichi Miura: "Cry & Fight", Excite
 AKB48: "Ōgoe Diamond", "365-nichi no Kamihikōki", "11gatsu no Anklet"
 X Japan: "Endless Rain", "Kurenai"
 Arashi: "Guts!", "Doors (Yūki no Kiseki)"

Final Results & Ratings

Notes
 Daichi Miura and Arashi were the first artists confirmed for this edition. Miura's "Excite" was released in January and topped #1 in Oricon Weekly Single Charts, and also contributed for "Mecha-Mecha Ikteru". Arashi was also confirmed for the conformation of Kazunari Ninomiya as white team's leader for the 6th time. Other Johnny's group confirmed to debut is Hey! Say! JUMP.
 AKB48, Keyakizaka46 & Nogizaka46 were confirmed for this Kouhaku. AKB48 currently is the best selling female artist after surpass Ayumi Hamasaki. Nogizaka46 has sold 2 million with "Influencer" and "Nigemizu". This will be the last time AKB48 member Mayu Watanabe will perform with the group, as well as Rie Kitahara. After rumours denied, Keyakizaka46 is confirmed. Once again, the two groups of the Sakamichi Series will perform the same night.
 The first confirmed embezzlements for this Kouhaku are: Ikimonogakari and Masaaki Hirao. The first (performed 9 times overall) announced finished hiatus in early January. The second, who participated four times overall in the program and was also the conductor of the closing theme "Hotaru no Hikari" (between 2006 and 2016), died on July 21, 2017, due to pneumonia.
 This is the first edition to be held on Sunday since 2006 (57th).
 Masaharu Fukuyama's performance on Kouhaku was held from a remote location, due to his "New Year's Eve Countdown Concert", on Pacifico Plaza.
 E-girls will have their first appearance on Kouhaku after the lineup changes from E★G Family.
 Five artists performed their Medleys: AKB48, Arashi, Daichi Miura, Little Glee Monster and X Japan.
 Hiroshi Itsuki's performance from "Yozora" is dedicated in memory of Masaaki Hirao.
 Debuting artists Hey! Say! JUMP and Little Glee Monster will be the first to perform on this Kouhaku. Sayuri Ishikawa and Yuzu will serve as this year's "Ootori".
 "Grand Opening" sequence was inspired on western musicals, such as La La Land.
 During X Japan's performance, Yoshiki played drums for the first time since his neck surgery.
 "Hotaru no Hikari" arrangement for the 68th edition is very different from the other years, with a key Eb.

References 

NHK Kōhaku Uta Gassen events
2017 in Japanese music
2017 in Japanese television